Mi Buen Amor may refer to:

"Mi Buen Amor" (Gloria Estefan song), song by Gloria Estefan, 1993
"Mi Buen Amor" (Mon Laferte song), song by Mon Laferte, 2017